The Power of Melody (also known as Delirium Tremens) is a 1912 American silent short drama film starring Harry Van Meter, Vivian Rich, and Eugenie Forde. The film was written by pianist Paul Williams of Morristown, Indiana.

Plot 
A dramatic portrayal of how music influenced the lives of several people in New York City and started them on a better course.

Cast 

 Harry von Meter as Albert Earle
 Vivian Rich
 Eugenie Forde

External links

References 

1912 films
1912 drama films
Silent American drama films
American silent short films
American black-and-white films
1912 short films
1910s American films
1910s English-language films
English-language drama films
American drama short films